"Heartbeat" is a song by American twins duo Nina Sky. It was released as a second single from their third studio album Nicole and Natalie on June 14, 2012. The song is released independently through their official website. Music video for the song is released on July 27, 2012, four days before the album's release. Later, Heartbeat: Remixes, a remix EP, was also released.

Music video
Its filming as started on May 26, 2012 when they put pictures of filming on Facebook. It was directed by Adam Sauermlich for the second time (he also has directed music video for the song "Day Dreaming"). Concerning the video, the band stated: "We knew we wanted it to be more about the feeling of the song and less about the story. The colors, environment, and everyone dancing in their own element creates this surreal feeling of freedom. It’s just about listening to the rhythm inside you and letting that rhythm guide you." On July 27 the music video was released. It features the sisters prancing through fields during a party with multi-colored smoke and dancing with many people.

Track listing
Digital download
 "Heartbeat" - 4:20

Heartbeat – The Remixes EP
 "Heartbeat" (AC Slater Remix) - 4:45
 "Heartbeat" (Bailey Smalls Remix) - 6:22
 "Heartbeat" (The Sizzaandz Remix)

References

External links
 https://www.youtube.com/watch?v=fX6legdcBH0
 https://soundcloud.com/nina_sky/heartbeat

2012 songs
2012 singles
Nina Sky songs
Epic Records singles